Oxley may refer to:

Places

Australia

Australian Capital Territory 

 Oxley, Australian Capital Territory is a suburb of Canberra, Australia

Queensland 

Oxley, Queensland is a suburb of Brisbane, Australia
Oxley railway station, Brisbane serves the suburb of Oxley
Electoral district of Oxley (Queensland) was a Queensland Legislative Assembly seat southwest of Brisbane
Division of Oxley is an electoral division for the Australian House of Representatives
Oxley Creek, a creek in Brisbane

New South Wales 

 Oxley, New South Wales is  a village on the lower Lachlan River, Australia
 Electoral district of Oxley (New South Wales) is a northern New South Wales Legislative Assembly electoral district
 Oxley Highway crosses northern New South Wales, Australia
 Oxley River, a tributary of the Tweed River, New South Wales

Victoria 

Oxley, Victoria is a town in North East Victoria, Australia

Canada 

Oxley, Ontario community in Essex, Ontario

New Zealand 

 Port Oxley was the original name for Otago Harbour in Dunedin, New Zealand

United Kingdom 

Oxley, Wolverhampton is a suburb of Wolverhampton, England
Oxley Green hamlet in Essex, England
Oxley Woods is a housing development in Milton Keynes, Buckinghamshire
Oxleys Wood is a nature reserve in Hertfordshire
Oxley is a former name of the Abbey river in Surrey

Other uses
 Oxley (surname)
 Oxley High School, a school located in Tamworth, NSW, Australia
 Oxley College (disambiguation), for disambiguation of the colleges
 Sarbanes–Oxley Act, a 2002 act of U.S. Congress